Yuliya Nesterenko (alt. spelling: Yulia Nestsiarenka, née Bartsevich (born 15 June 1979) is a Belarusian sprinter, Olympic 100 meters champion of 2004.

Nesterenko won the women's 100 metres at the 2004 Summer Olympics in Athens in 10.93 seconds, becoming the first non-black athlete to win the event since the 1980 Summer Olympics. She ran all four times (two qualification rounds, semifinal and final) under 11 seconds.

After the Olympic games in Athens she took an almost year-long break. At the 2005 World Championships in Athletics in Helsinki she reached the final in the 100 metres, though came only 8th (11.13 seconds). She won a bronze medal in another event, the 4 × 100 metres relay, together with her compatriots Natallia Solohub, Alena Neumiarzhitskaya and Aksana Drahun. At the 2006 European Athletics Championships in Gothenburg she was 6th in the 100m final and won a bronze medal in the 4 × 100 m relay.

At the 2008 Summer Olympics in Beijing, Nesterenko competed in the 100m again. In her first round heat she came 2nd behind Kim Gevaert in a time of 11.40 to advance to the second round. There she improved down to 11.14 seconds, but finished 4th, normally causing elimination, however hers was the fastest losing time and enough to qualify for the semifinals. She came close to reaching the final to defend her title with a time of 11.26, 5th place, while the first four athletes qualified for the final. Together with Aksana Drahun, Nastassia Shuliak and Anna Bagdanovich she took part in the 4 × 100m relay. In their first round heat they placed 6th with a time of 43.69 seconds, which was the 9th overall out of 16 countries. With this result they failed to qualify for the final.

Nesterenko is a member of the Belarus Olympic Committee.

References

External links 
 
 
 

1979 births
Living people
Belarusian female sprinters
Athletes (track and field) at the 2004 Summer Olympics
Athletes (track and field) at the 2008 Summer Olympics
European Athletics Championships medalists
Medalists at the 2004 Summer Olympics
Olympic athletes of Belarus
Olympic gold medalists for Belarus
Sportspeople from Brest, Belarus
World Athletics Championships medalists
World Athletics Indoor Championships medalists
Olympic gold medalists in athletics (track and field)
Olympic female sprinters